Sir John Davies Wilder Ormond  (8 September 1905 – 8 March 1995) was a New Zealand businessman and farmer.

Early life and family
Born at Waipukurau, New Zealand, Ormond was the son of John Davies Ormond Jr and Emilie Mary Gladys Wilder. He was educated at Christ's College, New Zealand. His sports were tennis and rugby. He married Judith Wall on 26 August 1939. They had four sons and one daughter.

He was the grandson of John Davies Ormond and brother-in-law of the politician Sir Hugh John Dyke Acland. His great uncle was Edward John Eyre, former governor of Jamaica. His cousin is the headmistress, Ormond Felicity Lusk.

Political career
He started out with a large sheep and cattle run. Later he was elected to the Waipukurau Branch of the New Zealand Farmers' Union (1927–1930).

He split the right vote, taking support from the official United/Reform Coalition candidate, Albert Jull. The Democrats also had a candidate, which further contributed to vote splitting on the right, and the electorate went to the Labour candidate, Max Christie.

In 1935, he was awarded the King George V Silver Jubilee Medal.

Wartime service
During World War II, he served in Greece, and received the British Empire Medal for diving off a troopship attempting to rescue a drowning man. Wounded in action he was invalided back to New Zealand, where he served as instructor and rose to the rank of army captain.

Postwar career
After the war, he saw the need for New Zealand to ship products abroad. He was the longtime chairman of the New Zealand Meat Producers Board, beginning in 1951. Later in life he organised the Shipping Corporation of New Zealand. He was its chairman until September 1979.

In his later life, Ormond retired to his cattle and sheep run. In the 1964 Queen's Birthday Honours, he was appointed a Knight Bachelor, in recognition of his role as chairman of the Meat Producers Board. In 1977, he was awarded the Queen Elizabeth II Silver Jubilee Medal. The Sir John Ormond Fellowship is named in his honour.

Notes

References

The New Zealand Herald Business section 19 January 2001

1905 births
1995 deaths
20th-century New Zealand businesspeople
New Zealand farmers
New Zealand Army officers
People educated at Christ's College, Christchurch
New Zealand recipients of the British Empire Medal
New Zealand Knights Bachelor
New Zealand military personnel of World War II
Unsuccessful candidates in the 1938 New Zealand general election
Unsuccessful candidates in the 1935 New Zealand general election
New Zealand National Party politicians
People from Waipukurau
Businesspeople awarded knighthoods
New Zealand justices of the peace
John